Frank Thomas Smith FRS (1948) is a Goldsmid professor in the department of mathematics in the University College London, a specialist in Fluid Mechanics.

Biography
Frank Smith completed his doctoral degree in 1972 at the University of Oxford. Smith has made significant contributions to triple-deck theory applied to boundary layer flows, separated flows, biofluid mechanics, skimming-stone problem, etc. He is the director of Lighthill institute of mathematical sciences.

Awards and honours
Smith was elected a Fellow of the Royal Society in 1984.

References

External links
 

Fellows of the Royal Society
Fluid dynamicists
1948 births
Alumni of the University of Oxford
Living people